David Earl Martin (born March 13, 1979) is a former American football tight end and is currently the tight ends coach at Maryville College. He was drafted by the Green Bay Packers in the sixth round of the 2001 NFL Draft. He also played for the Miami Dolphins and Buffalo Bills. He played college football at Tennessee.

Martin is married to fellow Tennessee alum and five-time All-American sprinter Kameisha Bennett. They have two children together: Darius (born 2003) and Devyn (born 2007).

Early years
Martin did not play football until his final two years at Norview High School in Norfolk, Virginia, yet was rated as the ninth-best prospect in Virginia by SuperPrep at the end of his senior season. He received all-district and All-Tidewater Area honors, in addition to being named as the conference offensive player of the year as a senior, when he caught 35 passes for 690 yards and 11 touchdowns. Aside from being a wide receiver, he was a free safety on defense.

Martin was also a four-time letterman for the school's basketball team, averaging double figures in points his final two seasons.

College career
Martin played college football at Tennessee as a wide receiver. During his career he caught 46 passes for 543 yards and five touchdowns in 39 games.

Professional career

Green Bay Packers
Martin was drafted by the Green Bay Packers in the sixth round of the 2001 NFL Draft with the intentions of converting him to a tight end. He spent most of his Packers career backing up Bubba Franks. Altogether he played six years for the Packers making 87 receptions for 766 yards and nine touchdowns.

Miami Dolphins
On March 5, 2007 Martin signed a three-year deal with the Miami Dolphins. The team signed him to replace Randy McMichael who was released.
During his first year with the Dolphins he started all 15 games he played in making 34 receptions and two touchdowns.

Serving as the Dolphins' second tight end behind Anthony Fasano in 2008, Martin caught 31 passes for 450 yards and three touchdowns.

Martin was placed on season-ending injured reserve on September 6, 2009 after tight end Davon Drew was claimed off waivers.

Martin was waived on December 8, 2009 from the Dolphins, and was re-signed by the Dolphins on August 6, 2010. He was cut on September 4, 2010.

Buffalo Bills
Martin was signed by the Buffalo Bills on September 5, 2010, replacing J. P. Foschi as the second tight end on the Bills roster. He was released on September 27, 2011.

References

External links
Green Bay Packers bio

1979 births
Living people
Players of American football from Kentucky
American football wide receivers
American football tight ends
Tennessee Volunteers football players
Green Bay Packers players
Miami Dolphins players
Buffalo Bills players
People from Christian County, Kentucky